Lahore Qalandars  (abbreviated as LQ) is a Pakistani professional cricket franchise which plays in the Pakistan Super League, representing the city of Lahore. The home ground of the team is Gaddafi Stadium. The team is owned by Rana Brothers. The team is currently captained by Shaheen Afridi and coached by Aaqib Javed, a former Pakistani cricketer.

Lahore Qalandars is owned by Rana brothers. It was the second-most expensive franchise, and one of the few teams sold to an international company. The team finished at the bottom spot in the points table in each of the first four seasons of the PSL, before making its first appearance in the final in the 2020 edition. Then the team made another appearance in the 2022 PSL edition  and won the season. 

Fakhar Zaman is the leading run-scorer and Shaheen Afridi is the leading wicket-taker for the side.

Franchise history
In 2015, the Pakistan Cricket Board (PCB) announced that the inaugural season of the Pakistan Super League (PSL) would take place in February 2016 in the United Arab Emirates. On 3 December 2015, the PCB unveiled the owners of five city-based franchises. The Lahore franchise was sold to the Kausar Rana Resources Private Limited Company for US$25.1 million for a span of ten years, making it the second-most expensive team of PSL (after the Karachi Kings, which sold for US$26 million).

In 2016, under Players Development Program (PDP), the Lahore Qalandars franchise organised "Jazz Rising Stars" trials across eight Pakistani cities, to identify upcoming youth talent. Shortlisted players would travel to Australia and train with Sydney Thunder, while the top two performers would get the opportunity to play for the Qalandars. During the programme an ambidextrous fast bowler, Yasir Jan from Rawalpindi, was identified by former Pakistan fast bowler Aqib Javed.

2016 season

After drafting star players such as Chris Gayle, Umar Akmal, Dwayne Bravo, Azhar Ali and Yasir Shah in the initial player draft, Qalandars started the tournament with two consecutive losses against Karachi Kings and Peshawar Zalmi. Their first victory came against Quetta Gladiators.
The team won only two of their eight group stage matches, although they could still have qualified for the play-off section of the tournament if they had won their final group game against Islamabad United. A loss by five wickets saw Qalanders finish last in the first edition of the PSL. Despite playing only seven games, Umar Akmal was the highest run scorer of the tournament and won the 'Best Batsman' award for his 335 runs with four fifties. During the finals, Qalandars were given the "Spirit of The Game" award for showing the best sportsmanship throughout the tournament and "Fair play award".

2017 season

Lahore Qalandars icon player in first season of the PSL Chris Gayle was traded for Sohail Tanvir of the Karachi Kings during the off-season trade window. Sohaib Maqsood was also traded for Aamer Yamin of Peshawar Zalmi.
In September 2016, the team also signed New Zealand's former captain Brendon McCullum as their new captain during the off-season.

During the 2017 PSL players draft, Lahore picked a number of new players, including bowlers Yasir Shah and Sunil Narine. The team retained players such as Umar Akmal, Azhar Ali and Dwayne Bravo. Later Dwayne Bravo and Anton Devcich were replaced with Jason Roy and James Franklin while Shaun Tait was replaced with Chris Green.

In their opening game of the 2017 season, Lahore Qalandars lost a closely fought match to the Quetta Gladiators. In pursuit of 137, they managed 128 before being bowled out in the penultimate over. The team bounced back in the next match by beating defending champions, Islamabad United. A partnership of 71 runs between Jason Roy and Umar Akmal set up the Qalandar's chase of 159 before a quick cameo of 26(12) by Sunil Narine finished the game. However, in the following game, against Peshawar Zalmi, the Qalandars collapsed to 59 all-out inside 11 overs - the second shortest innings in T20 cricket history. But, Yasir Shah took 4 wickets for 7 runs in the defense to almost take his team to victory before the Zalmis prevailed by 3-wickets.

As the tournament progressed to Sharjah, the Qalandars registered their second win on the trot. That too against arch-rivals, Karachi Kings. The match was hard-fought between the two sides before the Qalandars prevailed by 7 runs in the final over. Fakhar Zaman, who was also adjudged man-of-the-match, set up his team's target of 180 through his quick-fire innings of 56(36). But in the next game, against Quetta Gladiators, the Qalandars were unable to defend a target of 201 despite being in control for most of the match. They allowed 78 runs to be leaked from the last 3.5 overs to end up on the losing side. However, following this loss, the Qalandars managed to win against Islamabad United by 1-wicket in a tense contest that saw them chase 146 runs in 19.3 overs. Umar Akmal anchored his team's innings by scoring 66 off 42 balls before Grant Elliott finished the chase with a six over midwicket.

As the tournament shifted back to Dubai, the Qalandars suffered back to back defeats against Peshawar Zalmi and arch-rivals, Karachi Kings. Against the Zalmis, the team could not chase down 167 after a drastic collapse from 38-1 to 43-6 and fell short by 17 runs. Following this, the Qalandars lost a must-win game against the Kings by 5-wickets. After putting up a respectable target of 156 on board, the team leaked 14-runs from the final over - including sixes on the last two balls to end up on the losing side. These two loses meant that the Qalandars finished at the bottom of the table after the league stage and were, in return, knocked out from the play-off proceedings for the second consecutive year.

2018 season

The Qalandars lost the first three games of the season, against Multan Sultans, Quetta Gladiators and, arch-rivals, Karachi Kings respectively - suffering major batting collapses in each. In the match against the Sultans, they went from 132-4 to 136 all-out, thus falling short in their chase of 180 by 43 runs. While against the Gladiators, they could not build on the excellent start they got. They were 60-2 in the fifth over but could only manage 59 runs in the remaining 15 overs to finish at 119-9. In reply, the Gladiator won by 9 wickets. In the match against the Kings, Qalandars were set a hefty target of 160 runs. They got off to a great start and were 68 for 1 in 6 overs before losing several wickets in quick succession during the middle overs to end up 27 runs short.

As the league stage shifted to Sharjah, the team's fortunes did not change and they lost a closely fought match to Islamabad United. In pursuit of a below-par target of 122 runs, the Qalandars were on course for an easy win at 77-2 in the 12th over, before losing wickets in quick succession to end up at 115-9. A penultimate ball six from debutant, Salman Irshad, leveled the scores before the team got all-out the next ball, instigating a Super Over. Batting first in the one-over eliminator, the Qalandars set a target of 16 runs, which the United achieved via a last-ball six. The Qalanders continued with their losing streak in the next game against Peshawar Zalmi. Batting first, the Qalanders once again suffered a batting collapse and went from 56-0 to 100 all-out. In reply, the Zalmis made the target with all 10 wickets intact - the first such instance in PSL's history. This loss effectively ended Lahore's chances for a playoff berth, making them the first team to be eliminated from the second stage of the tournament.

In July 2018, they were one of the six teams invited to play in the first edition of the Abu Dhabi T20 Trophy, scheduled to start in October 2018. On October 6, 2018 they won the tournament by beating Titans in the final.

2019 season

Team management picked twelve new players, during the 2019 PSL draft, including the International stars like AB De Villiers, Mohammad Hafeez, Corey Anderson, David Wiese, Sandeep Lamichhane, Haris Sohail, Brendon Taylor and Carlos Brathwaite.

Originally the Qalandars were to be captained by Mohammad Hafeez, but due to an injury during team's second fixture, he had to withdraw his name from the squad. Then, AB De Villiers captained in two matches while Fakhar Zaman led the side in their remaining six matches. Like, all previous seasons, they finished at the bottom of the points table this time as well, after winning only three of their ten matches, and as a result, were eliminated in the group stage.

2020 season

In the 2020 PSL, Lahore Qalandars reached the playoffs for the first time in PSL history (they were at the bottom of the points table in all previous editions of the PSL) after finishing fourth in the league that year. Lahore Qalandars beat Peshawar Zalmi by five wickets to qualify for the second eliminator where they beat Multan Sultans to qualify for the final. Lahore Qalandars lost to Karachi Kings in the final.

2021 season 
In the 2021 season of PSL, Lahore Qalandars had an excellent kickstart with winning their first match of the season against Peshawar Zalmi with chasing them down and getting 143/6 under 19 overs. The next day on 22 February 2021, Lahore Qalandars won against Quetta Gladiators by 9 wickets and 10 balls left. They did an excellent job here getting 179/1 in 19 overs. Lahore went ahead and won four matches and 0 losses. Half of PSL 2021 was postponed due to COVID-19. The next match they played was on 10 June 2021 in  Abu Dhabi between Lahore Qalandars and Islamabad United. This was a tricky match as Islamabad had completed 143 runs in 20 overs and having 9 players of their team out. Lahore Qalandars chased them and on the last ball Lahore Qalandars won by a single run and 5 wickets remaining. Having 144/5. This match introduced two new players of the Lahore Qalandars’ squad: James Faulkner as a fast bowler, and Tim David as Batsmen/ Wicket Keeper. Lahore Qalandars again won with 10 runs against Peshawar Zalmi. All seemed good for the Qalandars until the rematch against Islamabad where they dominated the Qalandars. The Qalandars lost by 28 runs and all out while chasing Islamabad with their 157 runs. Lahore lost their next matches against Quetta, Karachi Kings and then where Qalandars could have reached the finals against Multan Sultans. The Multan Sultans did 169/8 in twenty overs while the Lahore Qalandars did 89 and all out. This defeat was humiliating and led to the aftermath of Lahore Qalandars not qualifying for PSL 2021 play-offs. They ended the tournament with five victories and 5 losses.

2022 season

Lahore Qalandars started their 2022 PSL campaign with a match against Multan Sultans. They made a good total of 206/5 but were unlucky as Multan chased their total by scoring 207/5 thanks to good knocks by Shan Masood and Mohammad Rizwan. They got back to winning ways in their next match against Karachi Kings. Karachi scored 170/7 which Lahore chased down thanks to a century by Fakhar Zaman and won by 6 wickets. In their next match against Peshawar Zalmi, they batted first and scored 199/4. They restricted Peshawar to 170/9 with Zaman Khan taking 3 wickets and Lahore won the match comfortably by 29 runs. Their next match was difficult, against Islamabad United who were in good form. Lahore Qalandars made a mediocre total of 174/9. Still, they bowled brilliantly which included a thrilling last over in which Islamabad needed 12 runs to win. Still, it was bowled well by Zaman Khan who took the wicket of Asif Ali and only conceded 3 runs in the final over. In the end, Lahore won by 8 runs. In their next match against Quetta Gladiators, Lahore set a total of 204/5. Quetta went on to win by 7 wickets. In their next match against Multan Sultans, Lahore won by 52 runs. They played Quetta Gladiators next and won by 8 wickets. I their next match against Karachi Kings, Lahore lost by 22 runs. The next match against Islamabad United resulted in a comfortable win by 66 runs. The last match of the group stage against Peshawar ended up being a thriller with the match going to a super over which Lahore ended up losing.

Team identity
The Lahore franchise was launched on 12 December 2015 by owner Fawad Rana. The "Q" in the Qalandars was linked to both represent both Qatar and QALCO and Rana added that the name was chosen to highlight the Sufi culture of Lahore – "Qalandar" is a common term used in Pakistan to describe Sufi mystics or saints whose shrines attract millions of devotees and tourists. The team's logo features a Sufi performing the famous Sufi whirling with three stumps to his right and a cricket ball as the base, and is meant to represent the Sufi culture of the region The Qalandars' kit colors in the first season were red and black. Ahead of the second season, Qalandars launched new kits, with the red being changed to green.

Ambassadors 
Famous Film star Shaan was the team's brand ambassador from 2016 to the 2018 season.

Since 2019, Shaheen Afridi has been the brand ambassador.

Anthems 
The anthem of the team in 2016 season was "Dama Dam Mast" released in two versions; one by Asrar and other by Nabeel Shaukat Ali.
The official song for 2017 season "Dama Dam Mast Lahore Qalandars" was sung by Shafqat Amanat Ali.

Sponsors 
Mobilink was the team's first shirt sponsor and the title sponsor. Alkaram, a textile mill situated in Karachi, was announced as another sponsor and the media partner of the team is Geo TV. Royal Palm is the team's hospitality partner.

Rivalry

Qalandars have an active rivalry with Karachi Kings, and is considered to be the biggest rivalry in the PSL due to their historic economic and cultural rivalry. As of 2021 season, both teams have played against each other 14 times, with Qalandars coming out victorious in 6 of them. Both teams have a large fan following which makes their matches more intense and interesting to watch. Both teams are known to be the most expensive teams of PSL.

They have a budding provincial rivalry with the second team from Punjab, Multan Sultans. The matches between the two are known as 'The Punjab Derby'.

Current squad

Management and coaching staff

Captains

Source: ESPNcricinfo, Last updated: 18 March 2023

Result summary

Overall result in PSL

 Tie+W and Tie+L indicates matches tied and then won or Lost in a tiebreaker such as a bowlout or one-over-eliminator ("Super Over")
 The result percentage excludes no results and counts ties (irrespective of a tiebreaker) as half a win.

Source: ESPNcricinfo, Last updated: 25 February 2022

Head-to-head record

Pakistan Super League

Source: ESPNcricinfo, Last updated: 25 February 2022

Statistics

Most runs 

Source: ESPNcricinfo, Last updated: 2 February 2022

Most wickets 

Source: ESPNcricinfo, Last Updated: 27 February 2022

References

External links
 
 Lahore Qalandars channel on YouTube

 
Sport in Lahore
Cricket clubs established in 2016
Sports clubs in Pakistan
Cricket in Lahore
2016 establishments in Pakistan